North Dakota Highway 31 (ND 31) is a north–south state highway in the U.S. state of North Dakota. The southern segments southern terminus is a continuation as South Dakota Highway 65 (SD 65) at the South Dakota border, and the northern terminus is at ND 21 west of Flasher. The northern segments southern terminus is at Interstate 94 (I-94) north of New Salem and the northern terminus is a continuation as County Route 37 (CR 37) at the end of state maintenance in Stanton.

The portion of ND 31 in Sioux County, in the Standing Rock Indian Reservation, divides the Mountain Time Zone to the west and the Central Time Zone to the east.

Major intersections

References

031
Transportation in Sioux County, North Dakota
Transportation in Grant County, North Dakota
Transportation in Morton County, North Dakota
Transportation in Oliver County, North Dakota
Transportation in Mercer County, North Dakota